Ariël Jacobs (born 25 July 1953) is a Belgian football manager and former player who most recently managed Ligue 1 side Valenciennes FC and is currently employed as Director of Football at Oud-Heverlee Leuven.

Managerial career
While at La Louvière he led them to victory in the 2002–03 Belgian Cup.

Jacobs became new manager of FC Copenhagen in June 2012 following Carsten V. Jensen's resignation. His first season as manager of the club was a success and he led the club to the Danish Superliga-title in the 2012–13 season. On 21 August 2013, he was sacked as manager of FC Copenhagen as he failed to win in his first five games in the league.

On 14 October 2013, Jacobs was appointed manager of Valenciennes FC. He failed to secure the team from relegation following the 2013–14 Ligue 1 and he therefore left the club in July 2014.

Honours

Manager 
La Louvière
 Belgian Cup: 2002–03

Anderlecht Belgian First Division: 2009–10, 2011–12
 Belgian Cup: 2007–08
 Belgian Super Cup: 2007, 2010Copenhagen Danish Superliga: 2012-2013Individual'''
 Belgian Professional Manager of the Year: 2009–10 
 Guy Thys Award: 2010–11

References

External links
 F.C. Copenhagen profile
 Profile FootGoal

1953 births
Living people
Belgian footballers
Belgian football managers
K.S.C. Lokeren Oost-Vlaanderen managers
R.W.D. Molenbeek managers
R.A.A. Louviéroise managers
Royal Excel Mouscron managers
R.S.C. Anderlecht managers
F.C. Copenhagen managers
Valenciennes FC managers
Ligue 1 managers
People from Vilvoorde
Association football defenders
K.F.C. Diest players
K. Diegem Sport players
Danish Superliga managers
Expatriate football managers in Denmark
Belgian Pro League managers
Footballers from Flemish Brabant
Oud-Heverlee Leuven non-playing staff